
Year 281 (CCLXXXI) was a common year starting on Saturday (link will display the full calendar) of the Julian calendar. At the time, it was known as the Year of the Consulship of Probus and Tiberianus (or, less frequently, year 1034 Ab urbe condita). The denomination 281 for this year has been used since the early medieval period, when the Anno Domini calendar era became the prevalent method in Europe for naming years.

Events 
 By place 
 Roman Empire 
 Emperor Probus returns to Rome, where he celebrates his triumph over the Vandals and the usurpers  (Bonosus, Julius Saturninus and Proculus).

Births 
 Cai Mo (or Daoming), Chinese official and politician (d. 356)
 Theodore Stratelates, Roman general and martyr (d. 319)

Deaths 
 Proculus, Roman general and usurper

References